The list below consists of the BWF Super Series winners (including Super Series Masters Final) in every season.

2007

Most win: 9 titles
 Gao Ling

2008

Most win: 6 titles
 Yu Yang

2009

Most win: 7 titles
 Lee Yong-dae

2010

Most win: 8 titles
 Yu Yang

2011

Most win: 8 titles
 Wang Xiaoli
 Yu Yang

2012

Most win: 7 titles
 Ma Jin

2013

Most win: 7 titles
 Lee Chong Wei
 Zhao Yunlei

2014

Most win: 7 titles
 Zhao Yunlei

2015

Most win: 8 titles
 Zhao Yunlei

2016

Most win: 6 titles
 Chen Qingchen

2017

Most win: 7 titles
 Marcus Fernaldi Gideon
 Kevin Sanjaya Sukamuljo

Winners by country

List of most successful players

References

Winners
Badminton champions
Badminton-related lists